Franklin County High School is a high school located in Brookville, Indiana.

See also
 List of high schools in Indiana

References

External links
 Official Website

Public high schools in Indiana
Buildings and structures in Fountain County, Indiana